Calcium-binding atopy-related autoantigen 1 is a protein that in humans is encoded by the CBARA1 gene.

Clinical

Mutations in this gene have been associated with myopathy with extrapyramidal signs.

References

Further reading

External links
 
 

EF-hand-containing proteins